Catch reporting is a part of Monitoring control and surveillance of Commercial fishing.  Depending on national and local fisheries management practices, catch reports may reveal illegal fishing practices, or simply indicate that a given area is being overfished.

Manual Catch Reporting

The general industry practice is to write out a catch report on paper, and present it to a fisheries management official when they return to port. If information does not seem plausible to the official, the report may be verified by physical inspection of the catch. Alternatively, a suspicious vessel may need to carry an independent observer on future voyages.

Semi-automated Catch Reporting

Some Vessel monitoring systems have features that collect, from keyboard input, the data that constitutes a catch report for the entire voyage. More advanced systems periodically transmit the current catch as electronic mail, so fisheries management centers can determine if a controlled area needs to be closed to further fishing.

While there is no standardization as yet for catch reports, a starting point came from a 1981 Conference of Experts:

 Catch on entry to each controlled area
 Weekly catch 
 Transshipment 
 Port of landing 
 Catch on exiting a controlled area
 Days at sea
 Daily time at sea
 Seasonal catch limits
 Per-trip catch limits
 Limits on catch within certain areas
 Individual (vessel) transferable quotas
 Minimum or maximum fish (or shellfish) sizes

This was extended, in 1993, to include: to include the measurement of:
 catch
 species composition
 fishing effort
 Bycatch (i.e., species unintentionally caught, such as dolphins in tuna fishery)
 area of operations

A number of programs require tracking of days at sea (DAS) for a given vessel. They may require tracking the total cumulative catch of a given fishery.

Major Trends

Where the local fishery economy permits, perhaps with international funding, near-real-time catch reporting will become a basic feature of vessel management systems.  Software at fisheries management centers will cross-correlate VMS position information, catch reports, and spot inspection reports.

See also
 List of harvested aquatic animals by weight

References 

Fishing industry
Fisheries science